Adhemarius palmeri is a moth of the family Sphingidae first described by Jean Baptiste Boisduval in 1875.

Distribution 
It is found from Costa Rica into most of South America.

Description 
The wingspan is 99–124 mm. The species probably broods continuously, with records indicating adults are on wing from March to July and again in October.

Biology 
The larvae probably feed on Ocotea veraguensis, Ocotea atirrensis and Ocotea dendrodaphne.

References

External links
"Adhemarius palmeri". Sphingidae of the Americas. Archived February 13, 2009.

Adhemarius
Moths described in 1875
Sphingidae of South America
Moths of Central America